Chauncey Leopardi (born June 14, 1981) is an American actor known for playing Michael "Squints" Palledorous in the 1993 film The Sandlot and Alan White in the 1999 series Freaks and Geeks.

Career
Leopardi has been in films since he was five, and is known for his role at eleven years old as Michael "Squints" Palledorous in the 1993 film The Sandlot. Leopardi also made a single appearance in Boy Meets World, in the pilot episode. He also appeared in runs as bully Alan White on the short-lived NBC series Freaks and Geeks and as the geeky Navy sailor, Kyle, on The CW network's Gilmore Girls.  He has appeared in various other films and television series, including the 1995 comedy Houseguest. In 2007, he reprised his role of Michael 'Squints' Palledorous in the third installment of The Sandlot series, fourteen years after the original movie. During the late 1990s, he played a recurring role as Otto the Nome Prince in the ABC cartoon series The Oz Kids. In 2019 he appeared in the music video for the song "Homicide" by Logic featuring Eminem, lip syncing Logic's verses.

Filmography
 Coldwater (2013) - Eddie
 The Sandlot: Heading Home (2007) - Michael 'Squints' Palledorous
 CSI: Crime Scene Investigation (2005) (TV) - Lawrence Lafontaine
 The Sandlot 2 (2005) - Michael 'Squints' Palledorous, Flashback scene
 Gilmore Girls (2003-2005) (TV) - Kyle, 5 episodes
 Snoops (2000) (TV) - Mike Johnson
 Freaks and Geeks (1999-2000) (TV) - Alan White, 9 episodes
 Walker, Texas Ranger (1999) (TV) - Bobby Landrum
 Permanent Midnight (1998) - Jerry at 16
 7th Heaven (1998) (TV) - Todd's Friend
 The Opposite of Sex (1998) - Joe
 Trojan War (1997) - Freshman
 The Larry Sanders Show (1997) (TV) - Charlie
 The Paper Brigade (1997) - Charlie Parker
 Virtual Oz (1996) (TV) - Otto (voice)
 Sticks and Stones (1996) - Mouth
 The Big Green (1995) - Evan Schiff
 Casper (1995) - Nicky
 Houseguest (1995) - Jason Young
 Safe (1995) - Rory
 Huck and the King of Hearts (1994) - Huck
 Boy Meets World (1993) (TV) - Nicholas
 The Sandlot (1993) - Michael 'Squints' Palledorous
 The Commish (1993) (TV) - Sam Alexowski
 Evening Shade (1992) (TV) - Joel
 Father of the Bride (1991) - Cameron
 A Girl of the Limberlost (1990) - Billy
 L.A. Law (1990) (TV) - Eric Perkins, Age 7, 2 episodes
 Sticks and Stones (1996 film) - Mouth

Commercial appearances 

 ‘’Polaroid Commercial’’ (1990)
 Crush Orange Commercial (1993)
 7-up Commercial (1998) - Stand in
 Sunkist Commercial (2001)
 Hoyu Commercial (2006)
 KFC-Snacker Commercial (2008) - Friend with back pack on

References

External links
 
 

American male film actors
American male television actors
American male child actors
Living people
1981 births
American people of Italian descent
20th-century American male actors
Place of birth missing (living people)
21st-century American male actors